Amy Guidry (born 1976) is an American artist in Lafayette, Louisiana.

Early life
She grew up in Slidell, Louisiana, a suburb of New Orleans. She attended Loyola University of New Orleans where she received her bachelor's degree in Visual Arts in 1998. She was also awarded the Loyola University Art Scholarship, which is only awarded to one student per graduating class.

Career
Guidry's work has been exhibited in galleries and museums nationwide including the Visual Arts Center of New Jersey, the Alexandria Museum of Art, the Morehead State University Claypool-Young Art Gallery, Aljira a Center for Contemporary Art, the Acadiana Center for the Arts as well as Brandeis University and the Paul & Lulu Hilliard University Art Museum.

Her work is present in private and public collections including the Zigler Art Museum in Jennings, LA;  the City of Slidell; and the Cedar Rapids Museum of Art in Cedar Rapids, IA. Guidry's paintings have been featured in publications such as Professional Artist, Studio Visit, and Adbusters. Her work has also been featured on MTV's The Real World, Season 20: Hollywood.

Guy Sangster Adams, editor of the UK publication Plectrum- The Cultural Pick, wrote, “Forget mere high definition, the exceptionality of Amy Guidry’s mix of photorealism and surrealism, creates a fantastic heightened definition that presents a hyperreality that forces one to address and, with hope, redress our reality.”

References

Footnotes

Sources
 beinArt International Surreal Art Collective, Artist Profile, September 2010 beinArt International Surreal Art Collective
 Art Calendar Magazine, Louise Buyo, May 2010; p44 Art Calendar Magazine
 Fuselier, Herman. "An Artistic Eye", The Daily Advertiser, 23 October 2007: 1C

1976 births
Living people
American women painters
Loyola University New Orleans alumni
Painters from Louisiana
People from Lafayette, Louisiana
21st-century American painters
People from Jacksonville, North Carolina
Painters from North Carolina
People from Slidell, Louisiana
21st-century American women artists
20th-century American women artists